Paul Sixsmith (born 22 September 1971) is a retired Maltese international footballer.

Playing career
Born in Bolton, England, Sixsmith played youth football with both Manchester United and Preston North End, but did not make a league appearance for either team. He then moved to Malta, where he played with Naxxar Lions and the Maltese national side before retiring in 2006.

References

External links

1971 births
Living people
Footballers from Bolton
People with acquired Maltese citizenship
Maltese footballers
Malta international footballers
Manchester United F.C. players
Preston North End F.C. players
Naxxar Lions F.C. players
Association football defenders
English footballers